The Albertine sooty boubou (Laniarius holomelas) is a species of bird in the family Malaconotidae. It is found in Rwanda, Burundi and adjacent areas of Uganda and Democratic Republic of the Congo.

It was formerly considered as a subspecies of the mountain sooty boubou (Laniarius poensis).

References

Albertine sooty boubou
Birds of Central Africa
Albertine sooty boubou